The murder of Yun Geum-i was a murder case on October 28, 1992, at a  camp town in Dongducheon, Gyeonggi Province Gyeonggi, South Korea. Bar employee Yun Geum-i, then 26 years old, was sexually assaulted and murdered by private Kenneth Markle (Kenneth Lee Markle III), a 20-year-old member of the USFK 2nd Division. This case raised the issue of the U.S. Forces in South Korea as a social problem, and became an opportunity to start an earnest revision movement to U.S.–South Korea Status of Forces Agreement. Private Markle was sentenced to life in prison, which was later reduced 15 years after Geum-i's family received 71 million won (US$72,000) in compensation from the U.S. government in August 1993 (life terms and death sentences in South Korea are also generally reserved for people who have committed multiple murders).

Markle III was imprisoned in Cheonan prison on May 17, 1994. In 1995, he was fined 2 million won (US$2,000) for causing a disturbance in prison. He was released on parole on August 14, 2006, and deported to the United States. He'd made seven previous applications for parole, but all of them had been rejected. Markle died in February 2023.

Murder and aftermath 
In 1992, Yun Geum-i, a camptown sex worker in Dongducheon, was brutally killed by U.S. servicemen. Yun was found dead with a bottle stuffed into her vagina and an umbrella into her anus. In August 1993, the U.S. government compensated the victim's family with about US$72,000. However, the murder of a 
prostitute did not itself spark a national debate about the prerogatives of the U.S. forces; on the other hand, the 1995 rape of a twelve-year-old Okinawan schoolgirl by three American servicemen (one  U.S. Navy Seaman, two U.S. Marines) elicited much public outrage and brought wider attention to military-related violence against women.

See also 
 Anti-American sentiment in Korea
1995 Okinawa rape incident
Yangju highway incident

References 

Yun Geum-i
South Korean murder victims
People convicted of murder by South Korea
Violence against women in South Korea